Onchidella campbelli is a species of small, air-breathing sea slug, a shell-less marine pulmonate gastropod mollusc in the family Onchidiidae.

References

Onchidiidae
Gastropods of New Zealand
Gastropods described in 1880
Taxa named by Henri Filhol